The 1956 Minnesota gubernatorial election took place on November 6, 1956. Minnesota Democratic–Farmer–Labor Party candidate Orville Freeman defeated Republican Party of Minnesota challenger Ancher Nelsen.

Results

See also
 List of Minnesota gubernatorial elections

External links
 http://www.sos.state.mn.us/home/index.asp?page=653
 http://www.sos.state.mn.us/home/index.asp?page=657

Minnesota
Gubernatorial
1956
November 1956 events in the United States